Pyaar Ka Saaya (English: The Shadow of love) is a 1991 Bollywood Thriller film directed by Vinod Verma and starring Rahul Roy, Sheeba Agarwal in lead roles.

Plot
Avinash Saxena lives with his uncle and cousin, Vimal. His uncle passes away, leaving the estate to him, as he is aware that Vimal is a wastrel and alcoholic. Nevertheless, the two cousins get along quite well. When Avinash goes to visit one of his houses in the country side, he finds out that his servant, Ram Prasad, had let his bedroom to a young woman, Gloria, without his permission. After he meets Gloria both of them fall in love with each other and get married in a simple temple ceremony. They then return to the city, where Gloria, who is now Pooja, is introduced to Vimal. Then one night while returning home from a late night movie, the couple are attacked and Avinash is killed, leaving Pooja widowed and devastated. Then a few months later, Pooja is approached by a fortune-teller, Maya Gangadhami, who informs her that Avinash has been in touch with her and would like to console her as well as warn her that the man who killed him is also going to kill her also. Pooja ridicules this, and tells Vimal about this. What Pooja does not know is that Vimal himself was responsible for hiring the killer to kill Avinash so that he could inherit the estate and wealth as the sole surviving relative, and with no proof available of Pooja's marriage, all he has to do is arrange her "death" at the hands of the same killer.

Cast
 Rahul Roy as Avinash Saxena "Avi" / Rakesh Saxena (Double Role) 
 Sheeba Agarwal as Pooja Saxena 
 Amrita Singh as Maya Saxena / Gangadhami
 Mohnish Behl as Vimal Saxena 
 Avtar Gill as Raghav 
 Brij Gopal as Robert 
 Anant Mahadevan
 Johnny Whisky 
 Babbanlal Yadav as Ram Prasad 
 Ghanshyam Rohera as Maya's Client 
 Ramesh Goyal as Inspector who refused to take Pooja's report against Vimal
 Dilip Sinha

Soundtrack

The soundtrack of the movie was composed by the duo Nadeem-Shravan. The lyrics were written by Sameer. The soundtrack was released in 1991 on Audio Cassette, Vinyl & Compact Disc in Venus Records & Tapes and Melody International Limited, which consists of 7 songs. The full album is recorded by Kumar Sanu, Asha Bhosle, Vijay Benedict and Alisha Chinoy.

Reception
The film was said to be a remake of the Hollywood film Ghost (1990).

References

External links
 

1991 films
1990s Hindi-language films
1990s thriller drama films
Films scored by Nadeem–Shravan
Indian remakes of American films
Indian thriller drama films